Mueang Mae Hong Son is the capital district (amphoe mueang) of Mae Hong Son province, northern Thailand.

History
The Interior Ministry upgraded Mueang Mae Hong Son to a fourth-class city under Monthon Phayap on 10 May 1910. It then consisted of the four districts, Mueang Mae Hong Son, Mueang Yuam (now Mae Sariang District), Pai, and Khun Yuam.

In 1917, the district was renamed from Mueang to Muai To (ม่วยต่อ). In 1938 it was renamed Mueang Mae Hong Son. The northeastern part of the district was split off in 1987 and formed the new district Pang Mapha.

Geography
The Daen Lao Range dominates the landscape of this district. Neighboring districts are (from south clockwise): Khun Yuam of Mae Hong Son Province; Kayah State of Myanmar; Pang Mapha and Pai of Mae Hong Son Province; and Galyani Vadhana and Mae Chaem of Chiang Mai province.

The Namtok Mae Surin National Park office is in the district.

Administration
The district is divided into seven sub-districts (tambons), which are further subdivided into 70 villages (mubans). Mae Hong Son itself is a town (thesaban mueang) which covers tambon Chong Kham. Each of the other six tambons is administered by a tambon administrative organization (TAO).

Missing numbers are tambons which now form Pang Mapha District.

References

External links

 Namtok Mae Surin National Park

Mae Hong Son
Mueang Mae Hong Son